Murder on the Home Front is a two-part British television crime drama, written by David Kane and directed by Geoffrey Sax, that first broadcast on ITV on 9 May 2013. The series, which stars Patrick Kennedy and Tamzin Merchant in the principal roles, follows Dr. Lennox Collins (Kennedy), a home office pathologist new to murder cases who teams up with his receptionist, Molly Cooper (Merchant) to investigate a serial killer operating at the height of the Blitz. The series' script was based upon the memoirs of Molly Lefebure, secretary to the former Second World War Home Office pathologist Keith Simpson.

The series aired as a single presentation on PBS in the United States on 16 February 2014. Executive producer Sally Woodward Gentle said of the production, "With Geoffrey Sax directing Davy Kane’s witty and fast paced script, we hope to depict London in the Blitz as a city living life on the edge." The series was released on DVD via Universal Pictures on 29 July 2013.

Cast
 Patrick Kennedy as Dr. Lennox Collins
 Tamzin Merchant as Molly Cooper
 Emerald Fennell as Issy Quennell
 James Fleet as Professor Henry Stephens
 David Sturzaker as DI Freddie Wilkins
 Iain McKee as DS Brady
 Ryan Gage as Danny Hastings
 John Heffernan as Wilfred Zeigler
 John Bowe as Ronald Terry
 Richard Bremmer as Charlie Maxton
 Susie Blake as Miss Jenkins
 Ria Zmitrowicz as Wilma Grey
 Siobhan Hayes as Jenny Hatton
 Patrick Knowles as Rosanski

Episodes

Reception
The series broadcast to strong critical acclaim, with Sarah Rainey of The Telegraph writing; "A decent, gritty portrayal of Second World War Britain - one that doesn’t pretend life on the Home Front was a cosy tea party of do-it-yourselfers and make-do-and-menders - [which] has been a long time coming."

Alison Graham of the Radio Times commented; "Imagine a cross between Foyle's War and Silent Witness and you have Murder on the Home Front. It’s one of those brown, wartime dramas where lights are dim, ITMA’s on the radio and everyone is terribly plucky. A strange mix of the jaunty and the gruesome, though there’s a loving attention to period detail; even the bomb-sites look hand-crafted."

Keith Watson of the Metro was however slightly more scathing, writing; "The acting is spot on, but the tone is a touch wobbly. At times a cartoonish skit on 1940s stereotypes – think The Fast Show’s Cholmondeley Warner [sic] – Murder on the Home Front wants it all ways, throwing in the kind of grisly gore that’s customary in modern serial killer cases, but feels at odds with jaunty banter that’s saucily tongue-in-cheek."

References

External links
 

2013 British television series debuts
2013 British television series endings
2010s British crime drama television series
2010s British television miniseries
2010s British police procedural television series
ITV television dramas
English-language television shows
Television series about fictional serial killers
Television shows set in London
Films directed by Geoffrey Sax
United Kingdom home front during World War II
World War II television series